Gymnopilus rufosquamulosus is a species of mushroom-forming fungus in the family Hymenogastraceae.

Description

Habitat and distribution
Gymnopilus rufosquamulosus has been found growing on oak trees, in Texas during August.

See also

List of Gymnopilus species

References

rufosquamulosus
Fungi of North America
Fungi described in 1969
Taxa named by Lexemuel Ray Hesler